Jenny Lee-Wright (born 21 February 1947) is a British actress and dancer who later became a foley artist.

At age 16, she left school to train with the Ballet Rambert. Within a year, she became part of a French cabaret group that traveled the world. Upon returning to England, she joined Lionel Blair's dance troupe, and then turned to acting, appearing with such comedians as Morecambe and Wise, Dick Emery, Spike Milligan (in his Q series), Frankie Howerd, Tommy Cooper and, in particular, Benny Hill. Her work with Hill earned her the nickname 'The Sexiest Stooge'. Other television appearances included The Golden Shot, The Protectors and Masterspy (as Miss Moneypacker).

In 1970, she made her film debut in John Cassavetes's Husbands, in which she played the role of Pearl Billingham. Other films included Michael Apted's Triple Echo (1972) and the Amicus production Madhouse (1974).

She began to work as a Foley artist in the 1970s between acting jobs, and in a 1976 magazine interview attributed her sense of timing in that field to her training as a dancer. Wright stood in as the hostess on Bruce Forsyth's Generation Game for several weeks when regular hostess Anthea Redfern was absent on maternity leave. By the late 1980s, she had switched completely to Foley work, including such films as My Left Foot (1989), Shakespeare in Love (1998), Muppet Treasure Island (1996), the James Bond movie Die Another Day (2002), and The Phantom of the Opera (2004) based on the Andrew Lloyd Webber musical.

TV credits

Filmography

References
Citations

Bibliography
 
 
 

External link
, by the Highliners, via archive.org

1947 births
English television actresses
English female dancers
Living people
Actresses from London
English film actresses